Peter Dawson (born 9 May 1950) is an English professional golfer.

Dawson was born in Doncaster. He was a member of the European Tour in the 1970s and won his sole European Tour title at the 1975 Double Diamond Strokeplay. However his most consistent season by far was 1977, when he finished seventh on the European Tour Order of Merit, that being the only time he made the top thirty. He played in the 1977 Ryder Cup, becoming the first left-handed European to play in the competition. He also represented England in the World Cup that year partnering with Nick Faldo.

Since leaving the European Tour in 1981 he has worked as a golf director and club professional in Hardelot France, and then Penina and Sao Lorenzo, Portugal. He was also to coach the national teams in Denmark (where his students included Thomas Bjørn), Switzerland and Morocco. After turning 50, he played several seasons on the European Seniors Tour, with his best finish of 2nd after a playoff at the Tournament Players Championship at the Belfry.

Professional wins (1)

European Tour wins (1)

Playoff record
European Senior Tour playoff record (0–1)

Results in major championships

Note: Dawson only played in The Open Championship.

CUT = missed the half-way cut (3rd round cut in 1979 and 1982 Open Championships)
"T" = tied

Team appearances
Ryder Cup (representing Great Britain & Ireland): 1977
World Cup (representing England): 1977
Double Diamond International (representing England): 1977

External links

English male golfers
European Tour golfers
European Senior Tour golfers
Left-handed golfers
Ryder Cup competitors for Europe
1950 births
Living people